Minnalppadayaali is a 1959 Indian Malayalam-language film, directed by G. Viswanath and produced by Thiruppathi Chettiyar. The film stars Satyan and Miss Kumari. The film had musical score by P. S. Divakar and Ranganathan.

Cast
 Sebastian Kunjukunju Bhagavathar 
 Sathyan
 Kottayam Chellappan 
 Vijayam 
 Padmini Priyadarsini
Thiruvananthapuram Lalitha

References

External links
 

1959 films
1950s Malayalam-language films